Timothy Douglas Booth Jones (born 6 August 1952) is a former English cricketer.  Booth Jones was a right-handed batsman.  He was born at Dover, Kent, and was educated at Hastings Grammar School, before attending St Luke's, Exeter. He now teaches History at a school in Tunbridge Wells.

Booth Jones made his first-class debut for Sussex against Kent in the 1980 County Championship.  Booth Jones made 25 further first-class appearances for Sussex, the last of which came against Kent in the 1981 County Championship.  In his 26 first-class appearances, he scored a total of 1,034 runs at an average of 24.04, with a high score of 95.  This score was one of seven fifties he made and came against Somerset in 1981.  He made his List A debut against Yorkshire in the 1980 John Player League.  He made nine further List A appearances for Sussex, the last of which came against Leicestershire in the 1981 Benson & Hedges Cup.  In his ten List A matches, he scored a total of 110 runs at an average of 13.75, with a high score of 30.

References

External links
Timothy Booth Jones at ESPNcricinfo
Timothy Booth Jones at CricketArchive

1952 births
Living people
Sportspeople from Dover, Kent
Alumni of the University of Exeter
English cricketers
Sussex cricketers
People educated at Hastings Grammar School